Great Ealing School was situated on St Mary's Road,  Ealing W5 London and was founded in 1698.  In its heyday of the 19th century, it was as famous as Eton or Harrow, being considered "the best private school in England".

History
The school first took up residence in Ealing's Old Rectory. This was a moated  house with a magnificent garden which stood next to the church of St Mary where Ranelagh Road now runs and all the way northward, along St Mary's Road to Warwick Road. The school had a swimming pool, cricket greens, tennis courts and the once famous Fives courts. A row of five cottages were used as studies. Opposite the school was the parish workhouse, where the poor and infirm slept three or more to a bed.

The future King of France, Louis-Philippe, taught mathematics and geography at the school. He did this to support himself whilst living in exile in Twickenham between 1800 and 1815. 
 Eventually, the Rectory succumbed to dry rot and had to relocate in 1847.

It moved from the north side of St. Mary's Church in Ealing on the eastern side of St Mary's Road to the western side of the same road and was renamed The Owls, which then formed part of its crest.  In 1874, it became a day school teaching vocational subjects such as bookkeeping.  In 1879, it changed again, becoming a school for Jewish boys.

It closed in 1908 and the roads Cairn Avenue and Nicholas Gardens now stand upon the grounds.  The latter is named after the famous headmastering family of its greatest period.

Quotes
"The education was first-rate, particularly in the classics, and as there was no alternative to learn, the boys progressed rapidly, and the school turned out some bright fellows." Benjamin Armstrong, pupil and vicar.
 "We had cricket and rounders, and in the winter months football; petty fives against every petty wall; hopping and hopscotch, patball and trapball, prisoner's base (or bars?), tops of several kinds, and multiform games of marbles." Francis William Newman, pupil (1812–1821).

Headmasters
 Rev Dr David Nicholas - 1790s
 George Nicholas
 Francis Nicholas
 Charles Morgan in 1874
 Dr John Chapman from 1881

Notable students

 William John Blew, hymn composer and translator
 W. S. Gilbert of Gilbert and Sullivan
 Thomas Huxley - scientist
 Frederick Marryat - author
 St John Henry Newman - Cardinal Newman
 Hicks Pasha - soldier
 Henry Rawlinson - soldier and adventurer
 Zachary Pearce (1690–1774) Bishop of Rochester.
 George Augustus Selwyn (1809–1878), First Bishop of New Zealand.
 Charles Knight. Publisher

References

Defunct schools in the London Borough of Ealing
Educational institutions established in the 1690s
1698 establishments in England
1908 disestablishments in England
Educational institutions disestablished in 1908
Louis Philippe I